David William Yelland (born 1947) is an English film, stage and television actor.

Life and career
After reading English at Magdalene College, Cambridge, he began his career as an actor with three years at the Glasgow Citizens' Theatre. He has since appeared in numerous stage plays and television productions. Perhaps his most famous role was that of the future Edward VIII in the film Chariots of Fire.

He performed in the lead role of the BBC Television serial David Copperfield (1974), and is known for his portrayal of Nicholas Rumpole in the Thames Television series Rumpole of the Bailey, as the father of the main character in the London Weekend Television serial A Little Princess (1986), and for his role as a regular in ITV's Agatha Christie's Poirot as Poirot's valet, George. At the end of 2007 he played Ralph Nickleby in a revival of the play The Life and Adventures of Nicholas Nickleby, alongside his daughter, Hannah.

In 2016, Yelland played the role of Martin Bell in the BBC television film Reg.

Selected filmography

References

External links
 
 

English male film actors
English male stage actors
English male television actors
Alumni of Magdalene College, Cambridge
Living people
1947 births
Date of birth missing (living people)
Place of birth missing (living people)